is a Japanese Nippon Professional Baseball pitcher.

His wife is a former Japanese volleyball player Yoshie Takeshita.

External links

Living people
1979 births
People from Fukuyama, Hiroshima
Japanese baseball players
Japanese expatriate baseball players in the United States
Waikiki Beach Boys players
Nippon Professional Baseball pitchers
Hanshin Tigers players
Saitama Seibu Lions players
Hiroshima Toyo Carp players
Japanese baseball coaches
Nippon Professional Baseball coaches